This is a list of Colorado State Rams football players in the NFL Draft.

Key

Selections

Notable Undrafted Free Agents (UDFA)
The following players were not selected in their respective NFL Draft, but signed to a team as an undrafted free agent (UDFA) following the draft.

References

Colorado State Rams

Colorado State Rams NFL Draft